Guadua sarcocarpa, also known as the fleshy fruit guadua,  is a species of clumping bamboo found in Bolivia, Brazil, Ecuador, Peru, and Venezuela.

This bamboo is used for construction, ladders, fences, and digging sticks.

References

sarcocarpa
Flora of Bolivia
Flora of Ecuador
Flora of Peru
Flora of Venezuela